The  or TSO, was established in 1946 as the Toho Symphony Orchestra (東宝交響楽団). It assumed its present name in 1951.

Based in Kawasaki, the TSO performs in numerous concert halls and serves as pit orchestra for some productions at New National Theatre Tokyo, the city's leading opera house. It offers subscription concert series at its home, the Muza Kawasaki Symphony Hall and at Suntory Hall, the Concert Hall of Tokyo Metropolitan Theatre, and Tokyo Opera City.

The orchestra recorded the musical score for the 1984 movie The Return of Godzilla.

Permanent Conductors and Music Directors 
 Jonathan Nott (September 2014 – present)
 Hubert Soudant (2004 – August 2014)
 Kazuyoshi Akiyama (1964 – 2004)
 Masashi Ueda (1945 – 1964)
 Hidemaro Konoe

Note 
 The Tokyo Symphony Orchestra (東響, Tōkyō) is not to be confused with the Tokyo Metropolitan Symphony Orchestra (都響, Tokyō).

External links 
 

Musical groups established in 1946
Japanese orchestras
Culture in Tokyo
Musical groups from Kanagawa Prefecture